Ḥassan al-Kettani (born 16 August 1972 in Salé) is a Muslim scholar and former political prisoner from Morocco. Imprisoned for alleged connections to the 2003 Casablanca bombings, Kettani was pardoned by Mohammed VI eight years later after efforts by his lawyer and human rights groups, and the success of Islamists in Morocco's parliament.

Personal life
The Kettani family has historically been a part of Morocco's religious establishment, serving as both academics and preachers for centuries. He is the great grandson of Muḥammad ibn Jaʿfar al-Kattānī. Kettani was as student of fellow Moroccan cleric Muhammad Abu Khubza in addition to Abdullah al-Ghumari and Abd al-Aziz al-Ghumari, as well as Albanian cleric Abdul Qader Arnaoot. His family descends from the Islamic prophet Muhammad's grandson, Hasan ibn Ali.

Sentencing
On February 18, 2003, Kettani was arrested by Moroccan authorities. On September 23, he was sentenced to 20 years in prison in connection with the 2003 Casablanca bombings, for which authorities accused him of being an ideological leader. Kettani denied this and asserted that his conviction was politically motivated and illegal. Human rights groups criticized his sentencing as unfair. In June 2005, he and 664 other Islamists began a hunger strike in prison to protest their convictions. Moroccan politician Mohamed Bouzoubaa criticized the move as being more concerned with politics than human rights, though Kettani's lawyer Mustafa Ramid upheld that he and other Islamists were victims of unjust trials. A second hunger strike took place at the prison in Kenitra in 2010 though most detainees ceased after negotiations with authorities; Kettani continued the strike longer than all other detainees, continuing to uphold his innocence and demand a reopening of his case.

On February 5, 2012, Mohammed VI of Morocco pardoned Kettani along with other Islamists whom human rights groups believed had been unfairly jailed. Kettani's lawyer Ramid, who later became Morocco's Minister of Justice, referred to the pardon as an attempt by the government to hold out the olive branch for Islamists willing to make positive contributions to public life and shun extremism, comments with which Kettani concurred.

Post-release
Since his pardon, Kettani has denounced extremism and encouraged its rejection among Moroccan conservatives; regardless, he and another Islamist were deported upon arrival at Tunis–Carthage International Airport on May 14, 2012. Kettani, who had been invited to the country by Tunisian Islamists, claimed he was under the impression that he would be able to enter Tunisia freely after the Tunisian revolution. Despite his deportation, Kettani still praised the Tunisian airport security, claiming that he had been treated well by the authorities and even received an apology from Ennahda Movement officials before his deportation.

Views
Kettani has been described as an ideological leader of the Salafia Jihadia movement, though he and other detainees rejected this and saw themselves as normal Sunni Muslims with a Salafist orientation. Since his pardon he has openly criticized what he defines as Wahhabism, comments which have caused rifts among Moroccan Salafists. He has often spoken against what he sees as depraved Western influence in Moroccan society, and his views prior to his incarceration had been regarded as extreme by many in the security establishment. Since his release, Kettani and several other former detainees have been noted as denouncing extremism and violence. Kettani, along with other Moroccan conservatives, distanced themselves from the Moroccan branch of Ansar al-Sharia, refusing to lend support to the budding group.

Kettani's family being rooted in Morocco's traditional religious scholarship, he is an expert in both the Zahirite and Malikite schools of Islamic law, though his conservative views have been described as being at odds with the latter.

Citations

Jurisprudence academics
Living people
People imprisoned on charges of terrorism
Sunni fiqh scholars
Recipients of Moroccan royal pardons
People from Salé
Moroccan Sunni Muslim scholars of Islam
1972 births
Moroccan torture victims
Moroccan theologians
Moroccan Salafis
Prisoners and detainees of Morocco
People from Tétouan
Moroccan imams
Hadith scholars
Moroccan biographers
21st-century Moroccan historians
Moroccan writers
Hasanids
Sunni Muslim scholars of Islam
Sunni imams
20th-century imams